These are the results of the men's K-1 1000 metres competition in canoeing at the 1952 Summer Olympics.  The K-1 event is raced by single-man canoe sprint kayaks. Heat and semifinals took place on July 28.

Medalists

Heats
The 20 competitors first raced in three heats.  The top three finishers in each heat moved directly to the final.

Final

References

1952 Summer Olympics official report. p. 630.
Sports-reference.com 1952 K-1 1000 m results.

Men's K-1 1000
Men's events at the 1952 Summer Olympics